Jessica Reid may refer to:

Jessica Reid, character in Always Goodbye
Jessica Reid, character in The Lottery (2010 film)
Jessica Reid (dancer), partner of Joshua Adams

See also
Jessie Reid, baseball player
Jessica Reed, see List of Law & Order characters